WKFY (101.5 FM) – branded as Koffee FM – is a radio station licensed to East Harwich, Massachusetts.  WKFY signed on August 16, 2013 at 98.7 MHz with a stunt loop of "Old Cape Cod" by Patti Page. The official format debuted on August 19. The format features "oldies, classic album cuts and modern artists loved by older listeners." On June 9, 2014, WKFY extended its signal with the use of translator W263CU (100.5 MHz) in Hyannis, which is fed via WPXC-HD3 as well as translator W278DW (103.5 MHz) in Vineyard Haven, which is fed via WPXC-HD3 as well.

WKFY's studios are located on South Street in Hyannis.

Translators

Previous Logos

Logo used until addition of W300BE (107.9) which is now on 103.5 FM according to on-air announcements.

References

External links

2013 establishments in Massachusetts
Harwich, Massachusetts
Radio stations established in 2013
KFY
Soft adult contemporary radio stations in the United States